George MacQuarrie (born as George Donald MacQuarrie; June 2, 1873 – April 1951), was an American actor of the silent era.

Biography

MacQuarrie was born in San Francisco, California in 1873 as George Donald MacQuarrie. He appeared in more than 80 films between 1916 and 1951. His brothers were Murdock MacQuarrie, Frank MacQuarrie, and Albert MacQuarrie. He was married to actress Helen MacKellar (1895 – 1966). He died in 1951 at the age of 77.

Selected filmography

 The Eternal Sapho (1916) - Jack McCullough
 The Revolt (1916) - Dr. Goode
 The Heart of a Hero - Guy Fitzroy
 All Man (1916) - Gillette Barker
 A Hungry Heart (1917) - Marquis Henri de Sartorys
 The Social Leper (1917) - Henry Armstrong
 Forget Me Not (1917) - Sir Horace Welby
 The Stolen Paradise (1917) - Kenneth Brooks
 The Price of Pride (1917) - Ben Richardson
 The Iron Ring (1917) - Stephen Graves
 Betsy Ross (1917) - George Washington
 A Maid of Belgium (1917) - Roger Hudson
 Adventures of Carol (1917) - Col. Montgomery
 Her Hour (1917) - Ralph Christie
 The Tenth Case (1917) - Jerome Landis
 Diamonds and Pearls (1917) - Harrington Sr.
 Shall We Forgive Her? (1917)
 The Beautiful Mrs. Reynolds (1918) - George Washington
 The Gates of Gladness (1918) - Roger Leeds
 Wanted: A Mother (1918) - Dr. Homer
 Vengeance (1918) - Haven
 Stolen Orders (1918) - Adm. Gaveston
 The Interloper (1918) - Courtney Carvel
 The Cabaret (1918) - Stanley Sargent
 The Golden Wall (1918) - Rudolph Miller
 Joan of the Woods (1918) - Judge Philip Wentworth
 Heredity (1918) - Frank Graves
 Merely Players (1918) - Hollis Foster
 Appearance of Evil (1918) - Harold Brown
 Hitting the Trail (1918) - Reverend Thomas Roberts
 Love in a Hurry (1919) - George Templar
 The Bluffer (1919) - John Moran
 Mandarin's Gold (1919) - Geoffrey North
 Courage for Two (1919) - Douglas Sr.
 The Unveiling Hand (1919) - Bob Harding
 The Little Intruder (1919) - George Conklin
 The Social Pirate (1919) - Allen Hobington
 Love and the Woman (1919) - Grant Murdock
 Sacred Silence (1919) - Maj. Marston
 The Idol Dancer (1920) - Rev. Franklyn Blythe
 The Love Flower (1920) - Thomas Bevan
 The Whisper Market (1920) - Burke
 Uncle Sam of Freedom Ridge (1920) - Roger Blair
 The City of Silent Men (1921) - Mike Kearney
 Forbidden Love (1921) - Peter Van Zandt
 Find the Woman (1922) - Judge Walbrough
 A Virgin's Sacrifice (1922) - Sam Bellows
 Backbone (1923) - The Constable of France
 The Ragged Edge (1923) - McClintock
 The Hunchback of Notre Dame (1923) - (uncredited)
 Half-A-Dollar-Bill (1924) - Martin Webber
 The Rejected Woman (1924) - Samuel Du Prez
 The Street of Tears (1924) - Dan Weller
 The Hole in the Wall (1929) - Inspector
 Abraham Lincoln (1930) - Member of Lincoln's Cabinet (uncredited)
 King Kong (1933) - Police Captain (uncredited)
 A Bedtime Story (1933) - Henry Joudain
 Duck Soup (1933) - Judge #1 (uncredited)
 You're Telling Me! (1934) - Crabbe (uncredited)
 The Cat's-Paw (1934) - Assistant District Attorney (uncredited)
 The Mighty Barnum (1934) - Daniel Webster
 Life Returns (1935) - Judge
 Wings in the Dark (1935) - Crawford - Banke (uncredited)
 All the King's Horses (1935) - Prince Rumpfeffer (uncredited)
 Les Misérables (1935) - Doorman at Arras (uncredited)
 The Black Room (1935) - The Judge (uncredited)
 Call of the Wild (1935) - Mounted Policeman
 The Crusades (1935) - Captain of Templars (uncredited)
 Diamond Jim (1935) - Stockbroker (uncredited)
 Klondike Annie (1936) - Port Officer (uncredited)
 Desire (1936) - Clerk With Gun (scenes deleted)
 Robin Hood of El Dorado (1936) - Smithers (uncredited)
 Big Brown Eyes (1936) - Chief of Detectives (uncredited)
 The Border Patrolman (1936) - Jim Riker (uncredited)
 The Plainsman (1936) - Gen. Merritt
 The Last Train from Madrid (1937) - Driver (uncredited)
 High, Wide and Handsome (1937) - Peter's Man (uncredited)
 Souls at Sea (1937) - Doctor (uncredited)
 Lawless Valley (1938) - Tim Wade
 Hotel Imperial (1939) - Frightened Old Man (uncredited)
 Rulers of the Sea (1939) - Seaman (uncredited)
 Trail of the Vigilantes (1940) - Rancher (uncredited)
 Stardust on the Sage (1942) - Rancher Raymond (uncredited)
 The Sundown Kid (1942) - Rancher (uncredited)
 This Land Is Mine (1943) - Chief of Police (uncredited)
 Fourteen Hours (1951) - Rev. Dr. J.C. Parkinson (uncredited)

References

External links

1873 births
1951 deaths
American male film actors
American male silent film actors
Male actors from San Francisco
20th-century American male actors
RKO Pictures contract players